Bucaná River is a river in the municipality of Ponce, Puerto Rico. It forms from the confluence of Río Cerrillos and Río Bayagán. It is also fed by Río Portugues during its southernly run. Río Bucaná used to run for some  prior to canalization and other diversion work by the U.S. Army Corps of Engineers. This river is one of the 14 rivers in the municipality.

Tributaries
Río Bucaná is formed in barrio Machuelo Arriba by the confluence of the Bayagán and Cerrillos rivers. It has two tributaries, Río Portugues and Río Cerrillos.

Course
Río Bucaná originates in Cordillera Central at Monte Jayuya and runs in a winding fashion to the south receiving feeds from Rio Jauca, Rio Bayagan and Quebrada Guayo. Río Bucaná is channelized from the point it enters the city of Ponce and until it is fed by Rio Portugues (a river that is also channelized) in Barrio Bucaná at the southern tip of Julio Enrique Monagas Family Park. The channelization project started in 1974 and was completed in 1997. It was a multimillion-dollar investment, with just the first phase costing $120 million. The river empties into the Caribbean Sea near La Guancha.  A section of the river used to run alongside Route 14, near the former Hospital de Distrito (now Hospital San Lucas), but it has since been diverted.

The following table summarizes the course of Río Bucaná in terms of roads crossed. Roads are listed as the river flows from its origin at the confluence of Río Bayagán and Río Cerrillos rivers, located in Barrio Machuelo Arriba, north of the city of Ponce, to its emptying into the Caribbean Sea in Barrio Bucaná in the south (N/A = Data not available):

Uses
Río Bucaná is largely used for irrigation of crops on the southern plains of Puerto Rico located east of the city of Ponce.

See also
 List of rivers of Puerto Rico
 List of rivers of Ponce

Notes
1.One reliable source, (Puerto Rico Department of Environmental Resources) dated February 2007, states that this river forms from the confluence of Río Cerrillos and Río Bayagán. However, another reliable source, (Puerto Rico Office of Management and Budget) not dated but using data with dates that fluctuate between 2001 and 2010, shows the river forms from various minor streams, and that Río Cerrillos is a feeder river to Río Bucaná. In this article we are using the first source as the most reliable. Still, given that the U.S. Corps of Engineers has been working in redirecting and canalizing Río Bucaná, the reader is advised that the actual origin of the current river may be one of the two stated above or may well be different yet.

References

External links
 USGS Hydrologic Unit Map – Caribbean Region (1974)
 USGS Maps of Municipality of Ponce Rivers, showing Rio Bucana and others

Rivers of Puerto Rico
Rivers of Ponce, Puerto Rico